known as Forbidden Siren in the PAL region, is a survival horror stealth game developed by Project Siren, a development team within Japan Studio, and published by Sony Computer Entertainment for the PlayStation 2 in 2003. The game's plot revolves around an interconnected cast of characters that possess a power which enables them to see and hear what a nearby character sees. It was followed by a sequel and remake, a loose film adaption and two manga adaptations.

Gameplay
Siren is divided into stages, each taking place in one of ten areas in the village of Hanuda, and organized chronologically in a table called the "Link Navigator". In order to complete a stage, the player must accomplish a primary objective that usually involves reaching an exit point, subduing undead enemies called shibito, or finding an item. Objectives in different stages are interconnected via a butterfly effect, and a character's actions in one stage can trigger a secondary objective in another stage.

There are miscellaneous items scattered throughout each stage that give the player further insight into the plot's background. Once obtained, these items are archived in a catalog and can be viewed at any time during the game's duration. The game's player characters possess a psychic power known as "sightjacking", which enables them to see and hear what a nearby Shibito or human sees and hears, and thus pinpoint its position, as well as gain knowledge of their activities and of the position of obtainable items. The clarity of each target depends on the distance from the player character. Once a point of view is located, it can be assigned to one of certain buttons of the controller to easily switch between multiple points of view. However, the player character is unable to move during use of the ability and is thus vulnerable to attack.

The game encourages the player to avoid Shibito rather than fight them. Characters can walk silently, avoid the use of a flashlight, and crouch behind objects to elude detection. Certain mission objectives require the player character to use items and/or the environment to distract Shibito from their activity, in order for them to achieve a goal. Others require the player to escort a non-player character. Player characters can also shout at any time in order to get the attention of nearby Shibito. Within most stages, the player character can hide in certain places such as cupboards and lock doors to prevent Shibito from entering. When a Shibito hears a sound made by the player character, it will search in the direction from which they heard the sound. If a character is seen by a Shibito, the latter will pursue the character to kill them either with a melee or ranged weapon or by strangulation. The Shibito will also shout to alert other nearby Shibito. Once the character has remained out of the Shibito's sight for a period of time, the Shibito will give up and resume its usual habits. Weapons are available for the player throughout the game, ranging from melee weapons to firearms. While Shibito can be knocked out in combat, they cannot be killed and will reanimate after a short period of time. If a character is injured, they will eventually recover after a short period of time. Characters will also lose stamina during combat and while running, which will also naturally refill after a short amount of time.

Plot
The story of Siren is told through the alternating perspectives of ten survivors of a supernatural disaster in the (fictional) rural Japanese town of Hanuda (羽生蛇村, in the Japanese version) in 2003 (Heisei year 15). These events are presented outside of chronological order and deal primarily with the efforts of the viewpoint characters to both escape the town and find answers to what has happened in the three days immediately following the disaster.

Initially presented as being merely an earthquake the disaster is rapidly shown to be far more bizarre and wide-ranging. The majority of the population has become infected with an unknown affliction that appears to severely damage cognitive function, causing them to bleed from the eyes, become violently hostile on sight towards anyone not also infected and seemingly immortal, able to recover and heal from even the most grievous of injuries in a short time. All natural water sources and rainfall in the town have been replaced with a strange liquid (referred to as "Red water") and the town, previously located in a mountainous region deep inland, has become an island surrounded on all sides by an ocean of the red water with no other land in sight. Furthermore, multiple sections of the town appear to have been replaced with past versions of themselves with buildings destroyed by landslides 27 years prior, although derelict as if abandoned for decades, suddenly reappearing or replacing their more modern counterparts.

It is revealed over the course of the game that Hanuda, which is a strongly isolationist community due to historical religious persecution, follows a unique syncretic faith known as the "Mana Religion" that incorporates many Christian and Shinto traditions. The senior figures of this faith, in particular the nun Hisako Yao, had attempted to call forth and appease their god  Datatsushi (堕辰子) through ritual human sacrifice of a girl named Miyako Kajiro who they considered holy for her psychic abilities. When Kyoya Suda, an outsider to the town who had arrived to investigate online ghost stories, accidentally stumbles on the ceremony, Miyako, unwilling to be killed, uses the momentary distraction he provides to flee the scene and causes the ritual to fail. It is this failure that creates the disaster, pulling the entire town into another world where space and time are severely distorted.

The eponymous 'Siren' of the title, heard regularly all across the town throughout the game's events, is the Datatsushi's call, compelling Hanuda's residents to infect and immerse themselves in the ocean of red water, thus creating an army of subordinates called . The shibito then go about building a nest to house the Datatsushi's corporeal form once it is summoned, as well as killing and converting any remaining humans left in Hanuda. Despite Kyoya being able to slay the Datatsushi at the end of the three days, the story concludes with only one of the ten viewpoint characters; elementary school student Harumi Yomoda escaping from Hanuda alive and returning to the real world, as she is the only remaining human in the town not infected in some way by the red water.

Development and release

Rather than employ traditional facial animation methods with polygonal transformation, images of real human faces were captured from eight different angles and superimposed onto the character models, an effect similar to projecting film onto the blank face of a mannequin.

The game was re-released for the PlayStation 3 on the PlayStation Store. In June 2016 the game received a digital release for the PlayStation 4 in NA and PAL regions as an emulated and upscaled version of the PlayStation 2 original with added Trophy support.

Reception

The game received "average" reviews according to the review aggegration website Metacritic. GameSpot's reviewer Bethany Massimilla concluded that although the game had a great story, and interesting characters, it was also tedious. IGN's reviewer Jeremy Dunham praised the originality of the concept, the use of Sightjacking, the graphics and the storyline, but criticized the difficulty level and the trial and error nature of the gameplay. GameSpy's Bryan Stratton followed other reviewers in praising the storyline and atmosphere, but criticizing the nature of the gameplay. In Japan, Famitsu gave it a score of one nine, one seven, and two eights for a total of 32 out of 40.

Sequel and remake
Forbidden Siren 2 was released in February 2006. The game tells the story of several characters who become trapped on Yamijima, an island off the coast of mainland Japan. A film based on the second game was released concurrently.

Siren: Blood Curse is the third installment in the series and was released in July 2008. The game is a "reimagining" of the first game and it tells the story of an American camera crew's disappearance in a mountainous region in Japan.

The series was celebrated in the PlayStation 5 game Astro's Playroom.

Manga
Sony published a manga series titled Siren: Akai Umi no Yobigoe (Siren: The Call of the Red Sea) which was based on the first game. The manga was drawn by Wataru Kamio and ran from July 2014 to December 2015 in Home-sha's Shinmimibukuro Atmos magazine. The manga was scheduled to move to an online format in April 2016, but due to the author's health complications, the manga was put on hiatus. The game franchise's director Keiichirō Toyama and scenario writer Naoko Satō were supervising all aspects of the manga. It was ultimately discontinued. In 2018, a new ongoing manga titled Siren: ReBIRTH was published to commemorate the series' fifteenth anniversary. It is written by Saki Yoshi and overseen by the development team of the games.

Notes

References

External links

  
 Occult Land Collection 
 Urban Folklore Society 
 
 Siren at Hardcore Gaming 101

2003 video games
PlayStation 2 games
PlayStation 2-only games
2000s horror video games
Single-player video games
Siren (series) games
Stealth video games
Video games about amnesia
Video games developed in Japan
Video games featuring female protagonists
Video games scored by Hitomi Shimizu
Video games set in 1976
Video games set in 2003
Video games set in Japan
Video games set on fictional islands